Plymouth Light, also known as Gurnet Light, is a historic lighthouse located on Gurnet Point at the entrance to Plymouth Bay in the town of Plymouth, Massachusetts. The light is accessible only by passing through the town of Duxbury, which lies to the north. The tower is located inside the earthworks of Fort Andrew, which existed in the Civil War, War of 1812, and Revolutionary War.

The original lighthouse was built in 1768, burned down and rebuilt in 1801, when the single light became a pair, and rebuilt again in 1842, again as a pair. The light gradually lost importance as Plymouth Harbor silted up and lost most of its traffic. Then, when the Cape Cod Canal opened in 1914, there was a significant increase in vessel traffic past the light. The northeast tower was torn down and the remaining tower upgraded from a sixth order Fresnel lens to one of the fourth order. The fourth order lens is now on display at the Lifesaving Museum in Hull, Massachusetts. The light is the oldest wooden lighthouse in the United States. The property and the Duxbury Pier Light, in open water  to the SW are both managed by Project Gurnet and Bug Lights, Inc.

Plymouth Light was listed on the National Register of Historic Places as Plymouth Light Station on March 8, 1977.

See also
National Register of Historic Places listings in Plymouth County, Massachusetts

References

External links

Lighthouses completed in 1768
Lighthouses completed in 1801
Lighthouses completed in 1842
Lighthouses on the National Register of Historic Places in Massachusetts
Buildings and structures in Plymouth, Massachusetts
Historic American Engineering Record in Massachusetts
Lighthouses in Plymouth County, Massachusetts
National Register of Historic Places in Plymouth County, Massachusetts
1768 establishments in Massachusetts